Glackin is a surname. Notable people with the surname include:

John Edward Glackin, birth name of Eddie Linden (born 1935), Scottish-Irish poet and editor
Niall Ó Glacáin (c. 1563 – 1653), Irish physician in Italy
Paddy Glackin (born 1954), Irish fiddler

Surnames of Irish origin
Anglicised Irish-language surnames